Food Fighters is an American reality based cooking television series hosted by Adam Richman that pits a home chef against five professional chefs in a series of cooking competitions for a chance to win up to $100,000. The series premiered July 22, 2014 on NBC as a summer replacement series.  On January 21, 2015, NBC renewed the show for a second season.  The second season premiered July 2, 2015 and concluded September 3, 2015.  In season one, new episodes aired every Tuesday at 8 p.m. ET, while in season two new episodes aired every Thursday at 8 p.m. ET.  A third season was not announced by NBC, and as of July 2016, the show is no longer listed by the network as a current show.

Format

Food Fighters bills itself as "one part cooking competition, one part game show."  In each episode, a contestant who is a home-based amateur cook comes to the show with a list of five of their best recipes to prepare on the show.  The show is divided into five rounds, one round for each recipe.  In each round, a mystery professional chef comes in to challenge the contestant.  The chefs are represented as black silhouettes of themselves on a large video screen and on a graphic to the home viewer before being shown.  Once the chef is introduced, the contestant chooses one of their recipes to cook against the professional, and they cannot prepare a recipe more than once.  The contestant generally attempts to select a recipe that is not in the known style of the chef, as the chef does not know in advance what dish they will be cooking.  After a set cooking time (generally varying from 15–25 minutes), the contestant's and the chef's respective recipes are judged by a group of five ordinary food-loving people known as the "Dinner Party" in a blind taste test, who discuss positive and negative aspects of each dish.  A majority vote of the Dinner Party determines the winner of the round. Each round that the contestant wins earns them a cash prize.  The first round is worth $5,000, the second round is worth $10,000, the third round is worth $15,000, the fourth round is worth $20,000, and the fifth round is worth double the amount of the contestant's previous winnings, making a top possible prize of $100,000.  If the chef wins a round, the contestant does not win any money for that round but continues through the entire show. If the contestant does not win any round prior to the final round, that final round will be worth $10,000.

The fifth professional chef that competes is generally a celebrity chef that has frequently appeared on other cooking shows, especially those on Food Network, including Cat Cora, Elizabeth Falkner, Duff Goldman, Lorena Garcia, Jet Tila, and Gerry Garvin.  The set of the show is unique from other cooking shows in that it is a two-story set, with the contestant cooking in a kitchen upstairs on an upper level while the chef cooks in a similar kitchen on the lower level.  The show also publishes the contestant recipes on their website.

Episodes

Season 1 (2014)

S1E1: Elisha Joyce

S1E2: Kena Peay

S1E3: Annie Smith 

NOTE: In addition to the cash, Annie Smith was given a Tobii eye tracking speech recognition device for her disabled daughter.

S1E4: Nick Evans

S1E5: Cortney Anderson-Sanford

S1E6: Jon Coombs

S1E7: Melissa Clinton

S1E8: Jim Stark

Season 2 (2015)

S2E1: "I'm Bringing the Spice" — Jacky Herrera

S2E2: "You're in the Big Leagues Now" — Holly Haines

S2E3: "This Kid's Got Moves" — Troy Glass 

NOTE: In addition to the cash, 14-year-old Troy Glass was given a full two-year scholarship to The Culinary Institute of America.

S2E4: "This Cheerleader's Got Game" — Amber MacDonald

S2E5: "Fighting Fire with Food" — Ryan McKay

S2E6: "Fear My Skills, and My Heels" — Alyssia Birnbaum

S2E7: "The Lawyer Raises the Bar" — Zac Delap

S2E8: "Whiz Kid in the Kitchen" — Danielle McNerney 
 
NOTE:  When the contestant lost the first four rounds, it was announced that the last match would be for $10,000.12-year-old Danielle McNerney was given a trip to science camp from Education Unlimited and Sally Ride Science held at Stanford University, and Walmart gave $20,000 to help with her mother's charity.

S2E9: "Home Cook Heavyweight" — Will Spencer

S2E10: "This Soccer Mom Sizzles" — Alice Currah

References

External links 
 
 
 

NBC original programming
Food reality television series
Television series by Universal Television
2010s American cooking television series
2014 American television series debuts
English-language television shows
2015 American television series endings